András Paróczai (born 11 May 1956) is a retired middle distance runner from Hungary. He won three medals at the European Indoor Championships. He took part on the 1980 Summer Olympics in Moscow.

Achievements

References

External links 
 
 
 
 

1956 births
Living people
Hungarian male middle-distance runners
Olympic athletes of Hungary
Athletes (track and field) at the 1980 Summer Olympics
20th-century Hungarian people